The 1941 Wichita Shockers football team was an American football team that represented Wichita University (now known as Wichita State University) as an independent during the 1941 college football season. In their 12th and final season under head coach Al Gebert, the Shockers compiled a 1–6–1 record.

Schedule

References

Wichita
Wichita State Shockers football seasons
Wichita Shockers football